National Highway 208, commonly referred to as NH 208 is a national highway in  India. It is a spur road of National Highway 8. NH-208 traverses the state of Tripura in India.

Route 
Kumarghat - Kailashahar - Khowai - Teliamura- Amarpur -Sabroom.

Junctions  

  Terminal near Kumarghat.
  near Teliamura.
  Terminal near Sabrum.

See also 

 List of National Highways in India
 List of National Highways in India by state

References

External links 

 NH 208 on OpenStreetMap

National highways in India
National Highways in Tripura